Let Me Live in Your Life was Ben E. King's 12th album and 11th studio album, and his fourth record with Atlantic Records.  The album was released in 1978.

Some tracks from Rhapsody appear on this album.  "Tippin'", "I See The Light", "Dark Storm on the Horizon", and "Spoiled" are new tracks. "Let Me Live In Your Life", "Fifty Years" and "Sweet Rhapsody" were originally recorded by Motown group The Originals for their 1975 Lamont Dozier-produced album California Sunset.

Track listing
All tracks composed by Lamont Dozier; except where indicated
"Tippin'" (Bettye Crutcher) [4:00]
"Wonder Woman" [3:23]
"Let Me Live in Your Life" [5:03]
"I See the Light" (Bobby Manuel, Jimmy Joy, Jimmy McGhee, Melvin Robertson, William Murphy) [3:30]
"Fly Away (To My Wonderland)" (Lamont Dozier, McKinley Jackson) [4:06]
"Dark Storm on the Horizon" (Barry Goldberg, Gerry Goffin) [4:27]
"Family Jewels" [3:38]
"Sweet Rhapsody" [3:57]
"Spoiled" (Ben E. King, J.R. Bailey, Michael Brandon) [3:39]
"Fifty Years" [4:32]

Personnel
Bobby Manuel, Jay Graydon, Jimmy McGhee, Ken Mazur, Lee Ritenour, Stan Lucas - guitar
Jimmy Joy, John Barnes, Leroy Burgess, Patrick Adams - keyboards
James Jamerson, Norbert Sloley, Scott Edwards, William Murphy, Wilton Felder - bass guitar
James Gadson, Jim Gordon, Melvin Robertson, Richard Taninbaum - drums
Eddie "Bongo" Brown - bongos, congas
Gary Coleman, Michael Lewis - percussion
Christine Wiltshire, The Duncan Sisters, Gina Tharps, Gwen Owens, The Jones Girls (Brenda, Shirley & Valerie), Rhodes Chalmers & Rhodes, Roberta Moore, The Waters - backing vocals
The Memphis Symphony - strings
Johnny Allen - arrangements
McKinley Jackson, Paul Riser - horn arrangements

References

External links
 

Ben E. King albums
1978 albums
Albums arranged by Paul Riser
Albums produced by Lamont Dozier
Atlantic Records albums